Howard is a census-designated place (CDP) in southern Howard Township, Knox County, Ohio, United States. As of the 2010 census it had a population of 242. The United States Postal Service has assigned Howard the ZIP Code 43028. The community lies along U.S. Route 36.

Demographics

History
Originally called "Kinderhook", the community adopted the name "Howard" when the railroad was extended to that point. A post office called Howard has been in operation since 1872.

East Knox High School is located in Howard, as are the East Knox Local School District board offices. The Kokosing Gap Trail runs through Howard, Ohio.

References

External links
 East Knox Local Schools

Census-designated places in Knox County, Ohio
Census-designated places in Ohio
1878 establishments in Ohio
Populated places established in 1878